No More Time is the second full-length studio album by the British keyboard player Darrel Treece-Birch, which was released in August 2016. Lyrically, Treece-Birch uses water as the backdrop for the 15 tracks that make the album, which begins at some distant point outside of the space-time continuum and follows the very essence of the human spirit through its journey to finally return home to the Nexus of life's eternal regeneration.

Track listing
All songs written by Darrel Treece-Birch.
 Nexus Pt1 - 1:30
 Earthbound - 4:21
 Riding The Waves - 5:09
 Hold On - 4:07
 Requiem Pro Caris - 3:21
 Nexus Pt2 - 1:26
 Twilight - 3:47
 Mother (Olive's Song) - 4:37
 Freedom Paradigm - 6:03
 Nexus Pt3 - 1:11
 The River Dream - 6:59
 No More Time - 8:00
 Legacy - 4:02
 Music Of The Spheres - 7:34
 Return To The Nexus - 7:37

Personnel
 Darrel Treece-Birch - Keyboards, Vocals, Bass Guitars, Mandolin, Drums

Special Guests
 Phil Brown (Counterparts UK) - Acoustic Guitar, Electric Guitar
 Steve Grocott (Ten) - Electric Guitar
 Karen Fell (Gary Hughes Band) - Vocals
 Dan Mitchell (Formerly of Ten) - Electric Guitar
 John Power (Counterparts UK) - Bass and Fretless Bass Guitar, Acoustic Guitar, Electric Guitar, & Violin
 Dann RosIngana (Ten) - Electric Guitar
 Alan Taylor (Nth Ascension) - Vocals, Acoustic Guitar, Electric Guitar
 Gavin Walker (Nth Ascension) - Bass Guitar
 Martin Walker (Nth Ascension) - Electric Guitar

Production
 Recorded at War Room, Taylormade Studio, The Dog House Studio, Westmorland Studio, RW Studio, SJG Studio, Sandyforth Studio, 
 Engineered, Produced and Mixed by Darrel Treece-Birch
 Mastered by Dave Aston, Digital Audio, Skipton, UK

References

2016 albums